James Ranger (1889 – 26 April 1975) was a British politician. He was the Labour Member of Parliament (MP) for Ilford South from 1945 to 1950, having unsuccessfully fought the pre-war Ilford constituency in a 1937 by-election and being selected to fight the general election for that seat in 1939 or 1940; which was postponed due to the Second World War.

References

External links 
 

1889 births
1975 deaths
UK MPs 1945–1950
Labour Party (UK) MPs for English constituencies